Ricky van Wolfswinkel (born 27 January 1989) is a Dutch professional footballer who plays as a striker for Eredivisie club FC Twente. He has played top-flight football in the Netherlands, Portugal, England, France, Spain and Switzerland and has been capped twice by the Netherlands national team.

Club career

Vitesse
Van Wolfswinkel started his football career at the D-pupils of Vitesse Arnhem. In the A-juniors, he became top scorer in the national first division, winning a prize awarded by the Royal Dutch Football Association (KNVB) for the feat. This prize was presented by Wesley Sneijder in 2007. On 5 April 2008, Van Wolfswinkel made his debut for Vitesse's first team in a match against Sparta Rotterdam, in which he was the substitute in the 85th minute for Santi Kolk. Against De Graafschap, in the 2008–09 season, he was in the starting lineup for the first time. In his third match that season, against Sparta Rotterdam, he scored his first Eredivisie goal.

Utrecht

On 29 May 2009, Van Wolfswinkel announced his departure from Vitesse, subsequently signing a three-year contract with FC Utrecht. He began the 2010–11 league campaign with a goal in a 3–1 loss against Feyenoord. On 22 August 2010, he scored two goals against Willem II resulting in a 3–0 win for Utrecht. On 26 August 2010, Van Wolfswinkel scored a hat-trick against Celtic in the UEFA Europa League; Utrecht went on to win the match 4–0. On 3 October 2010, Van Wolfswinkel scored two penalties against Ajax to gain a 2–1 away win over the Dutch runners-up.

Sporting CP
On 3 June 2011, Van Wolfswinkel moved to Sporting CP, signing a five-year contract on a €5.4 million deal; Sporting CP was given financial aid by Sporting Portugal Fund and Quality Sports Investments. He scored his first goal for Sporting on 10 September 2011 against Paços de Ferreira in a 3–2 win. He was the SJPF Player of the Month for September 2011. Overall, he scored a total of 25 goals during the 2011–12 season, including a hat-trick in the final game, a 3–2 win over Braga at the Estádio José Alvalade on 12 May 2012.

In his second season in Lisbon, Van Wolfswinkel recorded another 14 league goals in 30 games, although his team missed out on European competition by finishing 7th. He scored a hat-trick, again in a 3–2 win over Braga, on 1 April 2013.

Norwich City
On 22 March 2013, it was announced that Van Wolfswinkel had agreed a deal to join English club Norwich City for the 2013–14 season, a transfer worth €10 million, plus up to €2 million in bonuses. He joined the Canaries on 1 July on a four-year deal. He stated that the famous Netherlands player Johan Neeskens had urged him to join Norwich, saying, "Ricky, you have to go. It's a great club for you. If you have a great feeling, do it."

He scored on his league debut on 17 August, in a 2–2 home draw for Norwich against Everton. After the match, he said in an interview that Manchester United and Netherlands international Robin van Persie also recommended Norwich to him. Van Persie was reported to have told Van Wolfswinkel that Norwich are "a difficult team to beat" and that the "crowd always get really behind them."

Van Wolfswinkel was involved in controversy in the 0–0 home draw against Cardiff City on 26 October 2013. After teammate Alexander Tettey was injured, Cardiff goalkeeper David Marshall sportingly put the ball out of play. Van Wolfswinkel quickly threw the ball to Leroy Fer, who kicked the ball into the goal. This caused outrage amongst the Cardiff players, who started shoving both Van Wolfswinkel and Fer. The goal was disallowed despite it not technically being a violation of any rules. In February 2014, he was alleged to have been kicked by Manchester City's Yaya Touré, who was investigated, and Van Wolfswinkel welcomed The FA's verdict that Touré has done no wrong.

Van Wolfswinkel failed to score for the remainder of the season, making 25 Premier League appearances in total,  while Norwich were relegated to the Championship after finishing with only 33 points.

Loans
On 5 August 2014, Van Wolfswinkel joined Saint-Étienne of the French Ligue 1 on a season-long loan. He stated that his goal was to work hard for the team and to be important for the club. Van Wolfswinkel scored his first goal for the club on 25 September, the first goal in the 1–1 home draw against Bordeaux. On 30 November, he scored the second goal as the team won 3–0 in the Derby du Rhône against Lyon, his team's first home win over their rivals in 20 years.

Upon his return to Norwich from his loan spell at Saint-Étienne, he scored against Rotherham United in the League Cup second round on 25 August 2015, a 2–1 away win.

On 31 August 2015, Van Wolfswinkel joined Real Betis of the Spanish La Liga on a season-long loan. On 24 September, he made his first appearance in a 2–1 home defeat to Deportivo La Coruña, replacing Jorge Molina in the 59th minute.  He scored his first two goals on 15 December in a Copa del Rey tie against Sporting Gijón, which finished as a 3–3 draw, and on 19 April 2016, he finally scored his first La Liga goal in a 1–0 home victory over Las Palmas.

Return to Vitesse
On 28 July 2016, Van Wolfswinkel rejoined Vitesse for an undisclosed fee from Norwich. On 6 August, he marked his comeback with a goal in the 21st minute to give Vitesse a 1–0 lead in an eventual 4–1 away victory over Willem II.

He ultimately scored 20 goals in 32 games for the league season, one behind Golden Boot winner Nicolai Jørgensen. This included a hat-trick on 8 April 2017 in a 4–2 win over Heerenveen at the GelreDome. 
He scored two goals in the final of the KNVB Beker against AZ on 30 April 2017 to lead the club to the title for the first time in its 125-year history.

Basel
On 14 June 2017, it was announced that van Wolfswinkel would join Swiss side Basel on a three-year deal. He joined Basel's first team for their 2017–18 season under head coach Raphaël Wicky. After playing in five test games van Wolfswinkel played his first team league debut for his new club on 22 July in the 2–0 away defeat against Young Boys in the Stade de Suisse. He scored his first goal for his new club in the next match in the 3–1 home win in the St. Jakob-Park against Luzern on 30 July. On 10 August, van Wolfswinkel scored twice as Basel beat Grasshoppers 3–2; his first double strike for the club meant that he scored four times in his first four league games for the club.

Van Wolfswinkel injured himself during the Champions League group stage home game against Benfica on 27 September. The game was won 5–0 and van Wolfswinkel had netted the third goal. However, the injury (a metatarsal fracture) meant that van Wolfswinkel could not play again in the first half of the season. He returned to the team after three months on 17 December in the 2–0 away win against Grasshoppers being substituted in five minutes from time.
 
Under trainer Marcel Koller Basel won the Swiss Cup in the 2018–19 season. In the first round Basel beat FC Montlingen 3–0, in the second round Echallens Région 7–2 and in the round of 16 Winterthur 1–0. In the quarter finals Sion were defeated 4–2 after extra time and in the semi finals Zürich were defeated 3–1. All these games were played away from home. The final was held on 19 May 2019 in the Stade de Suisse Wankdorf Bern against Thun. Striker Albian Ajeti scored the first goal, Fabian Frei the second for Basel, then Dejan Sorgić netted a goal for Thun, but the result remained 2–1 for Basel. Van Wolfswinkel played in five cup games and scored twice.

In August 2019, van Wolfswinkel underwent surgery for a brain aneurysm detected during a routine scan for concussion. After some complications and an injury in training, he returned to the squad in June the following year. His contract expired on 31 August 2020, but a week later, he signed for another two years. During their 2020–21 season under head coach Ciriaco Sforza made 25 league appearances, mainly as substitute. After the season van Wolfswinkel left the club. Between the years 2017 and 2020 he played a total of 148 games for Basel scoring a total of 54 goals. 88 of these games were in the Swiss Super League, 11 in the Swiss Cup, 16 in the UEFA competitions (Champios League and Europa League) and 33 were friendly games. He scored 28 goals in the domestic league, 4 in the cup, 6 in the European games and the other 16 were scored during the test games.

International career
Van Wolfswinkel played several matches for the Netherlands' national youth sides in various age groups and in August 2010 was called up for the senior national team for a friendly against Ukraine, during which he made his senior debut. He earned his second full international cap against Indonesia in June 2013.

Career statistics

Honours
Sporting CP
Taça de Portugal runner-up: 2011–12

Vitesse
KNVB Cup: 2016–17

Basel
Swiss Cup: 2018–19

Individual
SJPF Player of the Month: September 2011

References

External links

Netherlands U19 stats at OnsOranje
Netherlands U21 stats at OnsOranje

 

1989 births
Living people
Association football forwards
Dutch expatriate footballers
Dutch footballers
Eredivisie players
Van Wolfswinkel, Ricky
FC Utrecht players
Ligue 1 players
Netherlands youth international footballers
Netherlands under-21 international footballers
Netherlands international footballers
People from Woudenberg
Premier League players
Van Wolfswinkel, Ricky
SBV Vitesse players
Van Wolfswinkel, Ricky
Dutch expatriate sportspeople in Portugal
Norwich City F.C. players
AS Saint-Étienne players
Real Betis players
La Liga players
FC Basel players
FC Twente players
Swiss Super League players
Expatriate footballers in England
Dutch expatriate sportspeople in England
Expatriate footballers in France
Dutch expatriate sportspeople in France
Expatriate footballers in Spain
Dutch expatriate sportspeople in Spain
Expatriate footballers in Switzerland
Dutch expatriate sportspeople in Switzerland
Articles containing video clips
Footballers from Utrecht (province)